Plumeri is a surname. Notable people with the surname include:

Joe J. Plumeri (born 1943), American businessman
Terry Plumeri (1944–2016), American musician